First Presbyterian Church (FPC) of Gardner, Kansas is a PC(USA) congregation that was established in 1866.  The church now occupies its third building; the first two buildings both were destroyed, one after being hit by lightning, and another due to an electrical fire.

First Presbyterian Church has a congregation of approximately 400 adult members. In addition to weekly and holiday services, the church has an active youth group, and several community outreach programs.

See also
List of Presbyterian churches in the United States

References

External links
First Presbyterian Church, official website

Presbyterian churches in Kansas